Steve Wachalski (born 5 February 1983) is a German professional basketball player, who lastly played for Medi Bayreuth of the German Basketball League. He previously played for Telekom Baskets Bonn.

References

External links
 Eurocup Profile
 German BBL Profile
 Eurobasket.com Profile

1983 births
Living people
German men's basketball players
Medi Bayreuth players
Mitteldeutscher BC players
People from Köthen (Anhalt)
Power forwards (basketball)
Sportspeople from Saxony-Anhalt
Telekom Baskets Bonn players